Björn Göran Sebastian Wiechel (born 1983) is a Swedish politician and member of the Riksdag, the national legislature. A member of the Social Democratic Party, he has represented Västerbotten County since September 2014.

Wiechel is the son of journalist Hans Wiechel and Susanne Waldau. He was educated in Umeå and studied cultural geography at Umeå University. He worked as a store assistant at Clas Ohlson in Umeå (2001-2012), a bartender in Umeå (2008-2011) and a high school teacher in Umeå (2009-2011). He is the cousin of Markus Wiechel, a member of the Riksdag for the far right Sweden Democrats.

References

1983 births
Living people
Members of the Riksdag 2014–2018
Members of the Riksdag 2018–2022
Members of the Riksdag 2022–2026
Members of the Riksdag from the Social Democrats
Umeå University alumni